Shrew may refer to:

Animals 
 Shrew (family Soricidae)
 Treeshrew (order Scandentia), native to Southeast Asia
 Elephant shrew (family Macroscelididae), native to Africa
 Otter shrew (subfamily Potamogalinae), native to Africa
 West Indies shrew (genus Nesophontes), native to Caribbean islands (Extinct)

Literature
Shrew (stock character), a difficult woman
The Taming of the Shrew by William Shakespeare, in which the word refers to a difficult woman.

Other uses 
The Shrews, fictional characters in the animated series The Animals of Farthing Wood
Shrew, a name originally proposed for the British fighter airplane Supermarine Spitfire
The Killer Shrews, a 1959 science fiction film directed by Ray Kellogg and also featured on an episode of Mystery Science Theater 3000.
"The Shrew", a song by Beirut from their 2009 album March of the Zapotec

Animal common name disambiguation pages